Aqjeh Qeshlaq (also Romanized as Āqjeh Qeshlāq, Āghcheh Qeshlāq, Āqjā Qeshlāq, and Āqja Qishlāq; also known as Andzha-Kishlak) is a village in Niyarak Rural District, Tarom Sofla District, Qazvin County, Qazvin Province, Iran. At the 2006 census, its population was 115, in 25 families.

References 

Populated places in Qazvin County